John James Harrison (born 7 June 1961) is an English former professional footballer who played as a defender in the Football League for York City, and in non-League football for Leeman United and Osbaldwick.

References

1961 births
Living people
Footballers from York
English footballers
Association football defenders
York City F.C. players
English Football League players